Vishnu Prabhakar (21 June 1912 – 11 April 2009) was a Hindi writer. He had several short stories, novels, plays and travelogues to his credit. Prabhakar's works have elements of patriotism, nationalism and messages of social upliftment. He was the First Sahitya Academy Award winner from Haryana.  

He was awarded the Sahitya Akademi Award in 1993, Mahapandit Rahul Sankrityayan Award in 1995 and the Padma Bhushan (the third highest civilian honour of India) by the Government of India in 2004.

Life and career

Along with his work he pursued an interest in literature. He also joined a Natak company in Hissar. His literary life started with the publication of his first story Diwali in the Hindi Milap in 1931. He wrote Hatya Ke Baad, his first play in 1939. Eventually he began writing as a full-time career. He stayed with the family of his maternal uncle until the age of twenty seven. He married Sushila Prabhakar in 1938 who stayed as an inspiration source for his literature until her death in 1980.

After Indian Independence he worked as a drama director, from September 1955 to March 1957, in Akashvani, All India Radio, New Delhi. He made news when in 2005 he threatened to return his Padma Bhushan award after he allegedly had to face misconduct at Rashtrapati Bhavan.

Vishnu Prabhakar died at the age of 96, on 11 April 2009 after a brief illness in New Delhi. He was suffering from a heart problem and infection of the urinary tract. His wife, Sushila Prabhakar, had died in 1980. Prabhakar is survived by two sons and two daughters. His sons Atul Prabhakar and Amit Prabhakar decided to donate his body to the All India Institute of Medical Sciences, New Delhi as their father's last wishes.

How he became 'Prabhakar'
He became 'Vishnu Prabhakar' from 'Vishnu'; his name was listed as 'Vishnu Dayal' in the primary school of Mirapur. In the Arya Samaj school, on being asked the 'Varna', he answered – 'Vaishya'. The teacher put down his name as 'Vishnu Gupta'. When he joined government service, the officers changed his name to 'Vishnu Dharmadutt' because there were many 'Guptas' in the office and it confused the officers. He continued writing by the pen name of 'Vishnu'. Once an editor asked, "Why do you use such a short name? Have you passed any examination?" Vishnu answered that he had passed 'Prabhakar' examination in Hindi. Thus the editor appended Prabhakar to his name making it 'Vishnu Prabhakar'.

Bibliography

Novels
 Dhalti Raat, 1951
 Nishikant, 1955
 Tat Ke Bandhan, 

 Darpan Ka Vyakti, 1968
 Parchhai, 1968
 Koi To, 1980
 Ardhnarishwar, 1992

Story Collections
 Ek Kahani Ka Janam (एक कहानी का जन्म) (Collection of his Love Stories), 2008
 Aadi Aur Ant, 1945
 Rehman Ka Beta, 1947
 Zindagi Ke Thapede, 1952
 Sangharsh Ke Baad, 1953
 Dharti Ab Bhi Ghoom Rahi Hai, 1959
 Safar Ke Saathi, 1960
 Khandit Pooja, 1960
 Sanche Aur Kala, 1962
 Meri Tentis Kahaniya, 1967
 Meri Priya Kahaniya, 1970
 Pul Tootne Se Pehle, 1977,
 Mera Watan (मेरा वतन), 1980,
 Meri Lokpriya Kahaniya, 1981
 Meri Badrinath Yatra 
 Khilone, 1981
 Aapki Kripa (Short Stories), 1982
 Meri Kahaniya, 1984
 Meri Kathayatra, 1984
 Ek Aur Kunti, 1985
 Zindagi Ek Rehearsal, 1986

Poetry
 Chalta Chala Jaonga, 2010

Plays
 Naprabhat, 1951
 Samaadhi (Gaandhar Ki Bhikshuni), 1952
 Doctor, 1961
 Yuge-Yuge Kranti, 1969
 Toot-te Parivesh, 1974
 Kuhaasa Aur Kiran, 1975
 Tagar, 1977
 Bandini(बंदिनी), 1979
 Satta Ke Aar-Paar, 1981
 Ab Aur Nahin, 1981
 Shwet Kamal, 1984
 Keral Ka Krantikari, 1987
 Vishnu Prabhkar : Sampurna Natak (Part-1,2,3), 1987
 Pustak Kit
 Seema rekha
 Sanskar aur Bhavna

Biographies – Memories
 Jaane Anjaane, 1961
 Kuchh Shabd : Kuchh Rekhaayen, 1965
 Aawara Masiha, 1974
 Amar Shahid Bhagat Singh, 1976
 Sardar Vallabhbhai Patel, 1976
 Swami Dayananda Saraswati, 1978
 Yadaun Ki Teerthyatra, 1981
 Shuchi Smita, 1982
 Mere Agraj : Mere Meet, 1983
 Samantar Rekhaayen, 1984
 Hum Inke Rini Hain, 1984
 Mere Humsafar, 1985
 Rah Chalte-Chalte, 1985
 Kaka Kalelkar, 1985

Essays
 Jan-Samaj Aur Sanskriti : Ek Samgra Drishti, 1981
 Kya Khoya Kya Paya, 1982

Children's Literature
Imandar Balak 
 Mote Lal, 1955
 Kunti Ke Bete, 1958
 Ramu Ki Holi, 1959
 Dada Ki Kachehari, 1959
 Sharachandra, 1959
 Jab Didi Bhoot Bani, 1960
 Jeevan Parag, 1963
 Bankimchandra, 1968
 Abhinav Ekanki, 1968
 Abhinay Ekanki, 1969
 Swaraj Ki Kahani, 1971
 Hadtaal, 1972
 Jaadu Ki Gaay, 1972
 Ghamand Ka Phal, 1973
 Nutan Baal Ekanki, 1975
 Heere Ki Pehchaan, 1976
 Motiyon Ki Kheti, 1976
 Paap Ka Ghada, 1976
 Gudiya Kho Gayi, 1977
 Aise-Aise, 1978
 Tapovan Ki Kahaniyan
 Pahad Chade Gajanand Lal, 1981
 Balvarsha Zindabad, 1981
 Khoya Hua Ratan (खोया हुआ रत्न), 2008
 Pustak Keet

Miscellaneous
 Baapu Ki Batein, 1954
 Hajrat Umar 1955
 Meri badrinath ki yatra, 1955
 Kasturba Gandhi, 1955
 Aise Thai Sardar, 1957
 Ha-Du-Al Rashid, 1957
 Hamare Padosi, 1957
 Man Ke Jeete Jeet, 1957
 Murabbi, 1957
 Kumhar Ki Beti, 1957
 Baajiprabhu Deshpande, 1957
 Shankracharya, 1959
 Yamuna Ki Kahani, 1960
 Ravindranath Thakur, 1961
 Pehla Sukh : Nirogi Kaya, 1963
 Main Achhoot Hoon, 1968
 Ek Desh : Ek Hridaya, 1973
 Manav Adhikar
 Nagarikta Ki Aur
 Theka

Others
Plays: Prakash aur Parchhaiyan, Barah Ekanki, Ashok
संस्मरण: हमसफ़र मिलते रहे

Awards and honours
 Sahitya Akademi Award, 1993
 Mahapandit Rahul Sankrityayan Award, 1995
 Padma Bhushan, 2004
 Soviet land nehru award , 1976 for awara masiha
Both Sahitya Akademi and Padma Bhushan awards were given for his novel Ardhanarishvara (The Androgynous God or Shiva).

References

Sources
Sandhya Singh (Editor) 2004. Sanvaad Part 2, NCERT, New Delhi

1912 births
2009 deaths
Hindi-language writers
Recipients of the Padma Bhushan in literature & education
People from Muzaffarnagar district
People from Hisar (city)
Recipients of the Sahitya Akademi Award in Hindi
Writers from Haryana
20th-century Indian novelists
20th-century Indian biographers
20th-century Indian essayists
20th-century Indian dramatists and playwrights
20th-century Indian short story writers
20th-century Indian male writers